Bhagyavidhaata (English: Creator Of Fate) is an Indian television drama series that airs on Colors since 4 May 2009. Set in the urban district of Motihari, Bihar, the show deals with the Sinha and Prasad families. The series has been dubbed into Telugu on Gemini TV as 'Gruha Lakshmi' and into Tamil on Polimer TV as 'Saami Potta Mudichu'.

Plot

Season 1
Bindiya Prasad, a simple, middle-class girl, marries the wealthy Vinay Sinha through a practice common in her native region—where a bridegroom is abducted and forced to marry a bride at gunpoint. Bindiya herself is innocent in the matter but, once married, suffers neglect and ill-treatment in the Sinha family. Later, Bindiya's sister Poonam and Vinay's brother Vimlesh fall in love and get married.  Bindiya's brother Raja marries Vinay's female cousin Rekha. At long last, Bindiya wins the love and trust of her husband and in-laws. She becomes pregnant; however, Vinay is murdered by Kanchan a servant who loves him. Rekha is pregnant and gives birth to baby girl but dies of childbirth.after a few months later Bindiya gives birth to a baby boy however, Akhilesh, the hard-hearted eldest brother of Vinay, takes away Bindiya's newborn son.

Season 2
After a twenty-year leap, Bindiya lives in the Prasad house with her niece (Rekha and Raja's daughter), Mamta, and adopted daughter, Poorva. Rekha is dead while Raja is in jail, wrongly framed by Akhilesh. In the Sinha house, Akhilesh and his scheming wife Shobha raise Bindiya's son Suraj and treat him like a domestic help. However, he adores them and hates his mother, whom he has never met. Shobha and Akhilesh have three children of their own—Payal, Prem and Ratan. The story now revolves around Sakshi, the wife of Suraj, who tries to reunite Bindiya and her son, eventually succeeding in her efforts.

Cast

Season 1
Richa Soni ... Bindiya Prasad Sinha (Vinay's wife)
Vishal Karwal ... Vinay Sinha (youngest son of Sinha family, Bindiya's husband)
Smita Singh ... "Pun Pun Wali" Shobha Sinha (wife of Akhilesh)
Sushil Singh ... Akilesh Sinha
Parul Yadav ... Poonam Prasad Sinha (Vimlesh's wife, Bindiya's sister)
Yash Sinha ... Vimlesh Sinha (second eldest son of Sinha household, Poonam's husband)
Pujha Verma ... Rekha (Tillouri's daughter, Raja's wife, cousin of Vinay)
Bharat Kapoor ... Siddheshwar Sinha (father of Vinay, Akhilesh, and Vimlesh)
Neena Cheema ... Dadi (mother of Siddheshwar, Nageshwar, and Tillouri)
Darpan Shrivastava ... Nageshwar Chacha (younger brother of Siddheshwar)
Kiran Bhargava ... Tillouri (sister of Siddheshwar and Nageshwar, mother of Rekha)
Mukesh Naitani ... Umashankar (estranged husband of Tillouri, father of Rekha)
Meena Nathani ... Maalti Prasad (Sharada's wife, mother of Bindiya, Poonam, Renu and Raja)
Phool Singh ... Amarendra a.k.a. Litti Mama, brother of Maalti
Neha Sharma ... Chhuttu (younger sister of Shobha "Pun Pun Wali")
Pankaj Bajaj ... Advocate
Abbas Khan ... Kunwar (son of Nageshwar)
Ranii Pandey ... Chhutki (wife of Nageshwar)
Vaishnavi Rao... Renu (Bindiya and Poonam's sister)
Anand Suryavanshi ... Arjun, a police officer, father of Poorva
Ashish Vidyarthi ... Guruji (Naxalite leader)

Season 2
Smita Singh ... "Pun Pun Wali" Shobha Sinha, Akhilesh's wife
Richa Soni ... Bindiya Prasad Sinha, Vinay's wife
Deepti Devi ... Sakshi Sinha, Mr. Verma's daughter and Suraj's wife
Wasim Mushtaq ... Suraj Sinha, Vinay and Bindiya's son
Garima Tiwari ... Mamta, Raja and Rekha's daughter
Charu Asopa... Poorva Prasad (adopted by Bindiya)
Utkarsha Naik ... Maithili Sinha, Vinay, Akhilesh and Vimlesh's mother
Sushil Singh ... Akhilesh Sinha  
Aadesh Chaudhary ... Ratan Sinha, Akhilesh and Shobha's elder son
Karan Thakur (actor) ... Prem Sinha, Akhilesh and Shoba's younger son
Sehrish Ali ... Payal Sinha, Akhilesh and Shobha's daughter
Sonia Singh... Kamini Sinha, Prem's wife
Prakash Jais ... Rajesh "Raja" Prasad, Sharada's son, Bindiya's brother, and Rekha's husband
Atul Srivastava ... Sharada Prasad, Bindiya, Poonam, Renu and Raja's father
Pawan Chopra ... Mr. Verma Sakshi's father
Gulfam Khan ... Kamini's mother

References

External links
Bhagyavidhaata Official Site

Colors TV original programming
2009 Indian television series debuts
Indian drama television series
2011 Indian television series endings
Television shows set in Bihar